Deuterotinea balcanica is a moth in the Eriocottidae family. It was described by Zagulajev in 1972. It is found in Bulgaria.

References

Moths described in 1972
Eriocottidae
Moths of Europe